Latisha Chan and Martina Hingis were the defending champions, but Hingis retired from professional tennis at the end of 2017. Chan played alongside Peng Shuai, but they lost in the first round to Irina-Camelia Begu and Mihaela Buzărnescu.

Gabriela Dabrowski and Xu Yifan won the title, defeating Begu and Buzărnescu in the final, 6–3, 7–5.

Seeds

Draw

Draw

References
Main Draw

Eastbourne Internationalandnbsp;- Doubles
2018 Women's Doubles